Junker Blues is a piano blues song first recorded in 1940 by Champion Jack Dupree. It formed the basis of several later songs including the 1949 "The Fat Man" by Fats Domino and the 1952 "Lawdy Miss Clawdy" by Lloyd Price.  The song is about a drug user's conflict with life and the law, makes references to cocaine, "needles", "reefers", and life in the penitentiary, and contains admonishments against the use of hard drugs.

History
The song was written sometime in the 1920s by Willie Hall, known as "Drive 'em Down" Hall, a blues and boogie-woogie pianist from New Orleans. Hall never recorded nor received credit for the song. In 1940, Champion Jack Dupree, an American pianist who referred to Hall as his "father", recorded the song for the first time on Okeh Records (OKeh 06152).

In 1958, a different version of this song, Junker's Blues, penned by Dupree himself, and which focuses on the allure of hard drugs, appeared on Dupree's first album, Blues from the Gutter, featuring Larry Dale on guitar, Wendell Marshall on double bass, Willie Jones on drums and Pete Brown on alto saxophone.

Covers
Fats Domino attracted national attention to the song (Junker Blues) by varying the tune, changing the lyrics and calling it "The Fat Man".   Domino recorded the song for Imperial Records in Cosimo Matassa's J&M studio on Rampart Street in New Orleans, Louisiana on Saturday, 10 December 1949.  The song, an example of early rock and roll, features a rolling piano with Domino doing "wah-wah" vocalizing over a fat back beat.  The recording sold over a million copies,  and is widely regarded as the first rock and roll record to do so.

According to some sources, the original version, Junker Blues, served as a template for the 1951 song, "Junco Partner". Other sources however claim that "Junco Partner" was the 'national anthem' of the Louisiana State Penitentiary at Angola; and that with each inmate being required, as a rite of passage, to contribute, there are more than 3,000 verses to "Junco Partner".

Lloyd Price used the melody of "Junker Blues" in 1952 for his song, "Lawdy Miss Clawdy", as did Professor Longhair in 1953 for "Tipitina", for Atlantic Records that same year. A newer recording of Professor Longhair's "Tipitina", was later released on his album, New Orleans Piano, in 1972.  Smiley Lewis's "Tee-Nah-Nah" was yet another close copy.

In 1990, Willy DeVille recorded Dupree's 1958 "Junker's Blues" for his Victory Mixture album.  English actor and vocalist Hugh Laurie covered "Junker's Blues" on his 2013 album, Didn't It Rain.

See also
Junco Partner

References

Blues songs
Okeh Records singles